Monochamus thomsoni is a species of beetle in the family Cerambycidae. It was described by Chevrolat in 1855, originally under the genus Monohammus. It has a wide distribution throughout Africa. It contains the subspecies Monochamus thomsoni marshalli.

References

thomsoni
Beetles described in 1855